Bookmans, officially known as Bookmans Entertainment Exchange, is the largest used book retailer based in Arizona. It was founded in 1976 by Bob Oldfather. Besides books, the store also sells magazines, CDs, DVDs, electronics, video games, and musical instruments. All six stores have free access to Wi-Fi Internet. Bookmans stores are located in Tucson, Mesa, Phoenix and Flagstaff.

Bookmans is a member of the American Booksellers Association and the American Booksellers Foundation for Free Expression. The company is known for its annual reading competition open to Arizona elementary schools, called The Bookmans’ Reading Challenge. The company sponsors, among other things, local music and art venues like The Loft Cinema, public and festival events like the HoCo Record Festival at the Hotel Congress, and other local organizations and communities throughout Arizona.

References

External links
 Bookmans official website

Bookstores of the United States
Companies based in Tucson, Arizona
1976 establishments in Arizona
American companies established in 1976
Retail companies established in 1976
Independent bookstores of the United States